The 2019–20 season was Paris Saint-Germain Football Club's 47th professional season since its creation in 1970, and its 46th consecutive season in the top-flight of French football. It was their 50th season in existence.

On 30 April 2020, Paris Saint-Germain were awarded the championship based on PPG ratio following the early cancellation of the 2019–20 season due to the COVID-19 pandemic. They subsequently claimed both national cups to achieve a domestic treble. Furthermore, the team then qualified for its first-ever Champions League final, hoping to win its first European trophy since 1996. However, they were defeated by Bayern Munich 1–0.

Players
French teams were limited to four players without EU citizenship. Hence, the squad list includes only the principal nationality of each player; several non-European players on the squad had dual citizenship with an EU country. Also, players from the ACP countries—countries in Africa, the Caribbean, and the Pacific that were signatories to the Cotonou Agreement—are not counted against non-EU quotas due to the Kolpak ruling.

Squad

Transfers

In

Out

Kits

Pre-season and friendlies

Competitions

Overview

Trophée des Champions

Ligue 1

League table

Results summary

Results by round

Matches
The Ligue 1 schedule was announced on 14 June 2019. The Ligue 1 matches were suspended by the LFP on 13 March 2020 owing to COVID-19 until further notices. On 28 April 2020, it was announced that Ligue 1 and Ligue 2 campaigns would not resume, after the country banned all sporting events until September. On 30 April, The LFP ended officially the 2019–20 season.

Coupe de France

Coupe de la Ligue

UEFA Champions League

Group stage

Knockout phase

Statistics

Appearances and goals

|-
! colspan="16" style="background:#dcdcdc; text-align:center"| Goalkeepers

|-
! colspan="16" style="background:#dcdcdc; text-align:center"| Defenders

|-
! colspan="16" style="background:#dcdcdc; text-align:center"| Midfielders

|-
! colspan="16" style="background:#dcdcdc; text-align:center"| Forwards

|-
! colspan="16" style="background:#dcdcdc; text-align:center"| Players transferred out during the season
|-

References

External links
 

Paris Saint-Germain F.C. seasons
Paris Saint-Germain
Paris Saint-Germain
French football championship-winning seasons